Wynyard station is a former railway station located in Wynyard, Saskatchewan, Canada. The building was constructed by Canadian Pacific Railway, it is now only used for administrative offices. The station served as a division point on the mainline between Winnipeg and Edmonton and comprises:
one 1½-storey clapboard building including a passage waiting area and a 1-storey freight/baggage area
a round house and
remnants of the station garden
The building was designated a historic railway station in 1991.

See also

 List of designated heritage railway stations of Canada

References 

Designated Heritage Railway Stations in Saskatchewan
Canadian Pacific Railway stations in Saskatchewan
Railway stations in Canada opened in 1909
Disused railway stations in Canada
1909 establishments in Saskatchewan